Warsaw Chopin Airport railway station is the railway station of the Warsaw Chopin Airport in Warsaw, Poland.

The station was built as part of a new Terminal 2 in 2008 but remained out of service until the rail link was completed in 2012. The cost of the  link to Warszawa Służewiec was 230 million złoty. Following the reconstruction of the airport terminal in 2015 a passageway was built connecting it directly with the station.

Service to the station is provided by both Szybka Kolej Miejska and Masovian Railways.

Trains typically leave every 15 minutes. The journey to central Warsaw takes slightly over 20 minutes and falls under the integrated ticketing system of the Warsaw Transport Authority.

References

Chopin Airport
Airport railway stations
Włochy
Railway stations served by Szybka Kolej Miejska (Warsaw)
Railway stations served by Koleje Mazowieckie
Railway stations in Poland opened in 2012